Mary Tudor may refer to:

Mary Tudor, Queen of France (1496–1533), queen of France and princess of England; daughter of Henry VII, wife of Louis XII and then of Charles Brandon, Duke of Suffolk
Mary I of England (1516–1558), queen of England and Spain – daughter of Henry VIII and Catherine of Aragon
Lady Mary Tudor (1673–1726), daughter of Charles II and Moll Davis; wife of 2nd Earl of Derwentwater, Henry Graham and James Rooke
 Mary Tudor, graduate student of Wendell Johnson, who conducted the Monster Study
Marie Tudor, an 1833 play by the French playwright, Victor Hugo, which was based on Mary I of England
Mary Tudor (1911 film), a film based on the play by Hugo
 Mary Tudor (1920 film), a German silent historical film
Maria Tudor, an 1879 opera by the Brazilian composer Antônio Carlos Gomes based on the play by Hugo
 Mary Tudor (play), a 1935 British play by Wilfrid Grantham
Mary Tudor (The Tudors), fictional depiction of Mary I of England